The Clemenceau Case is a 1915 American silent drama film written and directed by Herbert Brenon and costarring Theda Bara and William H. Shay. The film is based on the French novel L'affaire Clémenceau, by Alexandre Dumas, fils, and is now considered to be lost.

Cast
 Theda Bara as Iza
 William E. Shay as Pierre Clemenceau
 Mrs. Allen Walker as Marie Clemenceau
 Stuart Holmes as Constantin Ritz
 Jane Lee as Janet
 Saba Raleigh as Countess Dobronowska (credited as Mrs. Cecil Raleigh)
 Frank Goldsmith as Duke Sergius
 Sidney Shields as Madame Ritz

Reception
Like many American films of the time, The Clemenceau Case was subject to cuts by city and state film censorship boards. For example, the Chicago Board of Censors for the 1918 reissue of the film cut, in Reel 4, two scenes in Iza's bedroom between her and Constantin beginning with her locking the door, Reel 5, scene on couch between Iza and her husband in which gown falls from her shoulder, and the stabbing.

See also
1937 Fox vault fire

References

External links

1915 films
1915 drama films
1915 lost films
Silent American drama films
American silent feature films
American black-and-white films
Films based on French novels
Films directed by Herbert Brenon
Films shot in Fort Lee, New Jersey
Fox Film films
Lost American films
1910s American films
1910s English-language films